Dolno Svilare is a village in the municipality of Saraj, North Macedonia.

Demographics
According to the 2021 census, the village had a total of 2.174 inhabitants. Ethnic groups in the village include:

Albanians 2.128
Others 46

Sports
Local football club KF Rinia 98 plays in the Macedonian Third League (North Division).

References

External links

Villages in Saraj Municipality
Albanian communities in North Macedonia